The  Poinsett Hotel, or Westin Poinsett Hotel, is a twelve-story, landmark hotel in downtown Greenville, South Carolina, one of the first skyscrapers in Greenville. Named for Joel R. Poinsett, Secretary of War under President Millard Fillmore,  the Poinsett replaced an earlier resort hotel, the Mansion House, built in 1824. In 1982, the Poinsett was listed on the National Register of Historic Places. The hotel is a member of Historic Hotels of America, an organization sponsored by the National Trust for Historic Preservation intended to promote heritage tourism.

Built at the end of an era during which small Southern cities demanded quality hotels to attract business travelers and symbolize their new urban status, the Poinsett Hotel was, in part, conceived to accommodate visitors to a biennial Southern Textile Exhibit held in Greenville.  A century-old hotel, the Mansion House, was razed and a larger building was designed for its Main Street location by noted New York architect William Lee Stoddart.  To help raise money for the project, local businessmen, led by textile magnate John T. Woodside (1864-1946), sold $100 shares of stock to 1,700 local residents; and the hotel was named for Joel R. Poinsett, a South Carolinian who had served as Secretary of War and as the first U.S. Minister to Mexico. Groundbreaking occurred in May 1924; and the $1.5 million Poinsett Hotel opened in June 1925.

The hotel was not immediately successful—in fact, it lost $30,000 in its first year of operation and never turned a profit in its first five years—but it prospered during the latter years of the Depression under the management of J. Mason Alexander (1895-1980), who emphasized customer service. Just how Alexander brought the hotel through receivership and made the Poinsett one of the most successful and popular hotels in the South "has never been fully explained." In 1946, the Poinsett was named the best medium-sized hotel in the nation. Another sixty rooms were added in 1941, bringing the total to 248.

As the number of private automobiles increased during the 1950s, city hotels lost business to motels, which were located on major highways rather than in the urban core. In 1959, the Poinsett was sold to Jack Tar Hotels, and its profitability continued to decline despite renovations made in 1964 that included all new wiring, 70 new telephones, ice machines, and a swimming pool on the roof of the parking garage. Ownership changed hands several times in the 1970s and '80s. Beginning in 1977, James C. Bible (1924-1991) tried to operate the hotel as residence suites for retirees, but he was perpetually at odds with city government over his inability or unwillingness to meet the fire codes.  The city finally closed the hotel in January 1987.  During the next decade the building was repeatedly vandalized, and intruders set two fires.  The hotel was considered one of the most endangered historic structures in South Carolina.

Nevertheless, the revitalization of downtown Greenville was already underway during the mayoral administration of Knox H. White. In November 1997, Steve Dopp and Greg Lenox, developers of the Francis Marion Hotel in Charleston (also designed by William Stoddart), purchased the Poinsett and acquired a franchise from Westin Hotels & Resorts. The project received about $4 million in tax dollars, and Federal Historic Rehabilitation Tax Credits were awarded as part of an approximately $20 million restoration. The Westin Poinsett reopened on October 22, 2000.  In 2014, tripadvisor.com ranked the Poinsett first among 63 Greenville hotels. A decade after the grand reopening, Knox White said that saving the Poinsett "was key to so much further growth of Greenville....People began to realize that redevelopment and historic preservation could happen, and it didn't just mean bulldoze and build modern."

See also
 List of Historic Hotels of America

References

Hotel buildings on the National Register of Historic Places in South Carolina
Buildings and structures completed in 1925
National Register of Historic Places in Greenville, South Carolina
Historic Hotels of America